Espierre is a locality located in the municipality of Biescas, in Huesca province, Aragon, Spain. As of 2020, it has a population of 3.

Geography 
Espierre is located 66km north-northeast of Huesca.

References

Populated places in the Province of Huesca